Schirmacher Massif is an island-like mountain massif in the east part of Palmer Land. The feature is surrounded by the flow of the Rankin and Cline Glaciers, 3 nautical miles (6 km) west of Rowley Massif. Mapped by United States Geological Survey (USGS) in 1974. Named by Advisory Committee on Antarctic Names (US-ACAN) for Eberhard G. Schirmacher, topographic engineer, leader of the USGS topographic party on two expeditions to the Lassiter Coast, 1969–70 and 1970–71. He was USGS party leader to Pine Island Bay, 1974–75.

See also
Schneider Peak

Mountains of Palmer Land